Ervin Tjon-A-Loi (born 6 April 1995) is a Surinamese professional footballer who plays as a midfielder for SVB Eerste Divisie club Inter Moengotapoe and the Suriname national team.

International career 
Tjon-A-Loi made his debut for Suriname in a 2–1 loss to Jamaica on 17 November 2018.

References

External links 
 
 

1995 births
Living people
People from Coronie District
Surinamese footballers
Association football midfielders
S.V. Leo Victor players
S.V. Transvaal players
F.C. West United players
Suriname international footballers
SVB Eerste Divisie players